París-Londres, also known as "La Gran Boutique", was a chain of department stores that were purchased by and rebranded as Suburbia in the 1990s after Mexico started to permit imports from abroad on a large scale. The main store was located at 81, 16 de Septiembre Street in the Historic Center of Mexico City, and there were branches at Perisur, Plaza Satélite and in Polanco.

External links
 Commercial for París-Londres on YouTube
 Print ad at Museo de la Marca

References

Department stores of Mexico
Defunct department stores